Richard Tyler may refer to:

Richard Tyler (architect) (1916–2009), British architect
Richard Tyler (designer) (born 1947), Australian fashion designer
Richard Tyler (sound engineer) (1928–1990), American sound engineer
Rick Tyler (Richard Seburn Tyler Jr., born 1957), white supremacist
Dick Tyler (Richard Tyler, born 1932), American actor
Richard Tyler (The 4400), a fictional character in the television series The 4400
Hourman (Rick Tyler), a fictional superhero